John Butt may refer to:

 John Butt (bishop) (1826–1899), English Roman Catholic bishop
 John Butt (musician) (born 1960), English conductor, organist, harpsichordist and scholar
 John Butt (politician) (born 1941), Canadian politician
 John Butt (sport shooter) (1850–1939), English sport shooter
 John Mohammed Butt (born 1950), Trinidad-born British Islamic scholar and broadcaster

See also
 John But (fl. 1402–1425), English politician
 John Butts (disambiguation)
 Johnny Butt (1870–1931), English film actor